Frederick Dunn may refer to:
Frederick Grant Dunn (1905–1959), American criminal
Frederic Stanley Dunn (1872–1937), American scholar of classical studies and Ku Klux Klan leader
Frederick Sherwood Dunn (1893–1962), American scholar of international law